"How Do You Talk to an Angel" is a song written by Steve Tyrell, Barry Coffing, and  Stephanie Tyrell. It was the theme for the American TV series The Heights. The single was released with Jamie Walters as the lead singer, and it reached number one on the US Billboard Hot 100 on November 14, 1992, but the series was canceled exactly one week after the song fell from its number one position. Vocalists on the single included Shawn David Thompson, Cheryl Pollak, and Charlotte Ross, as well as Zachary Throne from the Las Vegas rock band Sin City Sinners.

In 1993, the song was nominated for an Emmy Award for "Outstanding Individual Achievement in Music and Lyrics". The Emmy went to the song "Sorry I Asked" by Kander and Ebb from Liza Minnelli Live from Radio City Music Hall. No follow-up singles under The Heights name were ever released. Walters, the lead singer on the single and the lead actor on the show, later had a number-16 Hot 100 hit with his single "Hold On" in 1994. It was his only subsequent chart appearance.

Personnel
 Jamie Walters: lead vocals
 Steve Tyrell: producer, arranger
 Bob Mann: arranger, acoustic/electric guitar (inc. solo)
 Michael Landau: electric guitars
 Mike Finnigan: piano
 John "JR" Robinson: drums
 Leland Sklar: bass
 Brandon Fields: saxophone
 Barry Coffing, Guy Moon: keyboards
 Alex Desert, Charlotte Ross, Cheryl Pollak, Jamie Walters, Ken Garito, Shawn Thompson, Zachary Throne: background vocals

Charts

Weekly charts

Year-end charts

Decade-end charts

All-time charts

Certifications

References

1992 songs
1992 singles
Billboard Hot 100 number-one singles
Capitol Records singles
Rock ballads
Songs from television series
Songs written by Steve Tyrell
Music television series theme songs
Television drama theme songs